Yakety Yak (or similar phrases) may refer to:

 "Yakety Yak," a song written by Jerry Leiber and Mike Stoller and originally performed by The Coasters in 1958
 "Yakety Yak, Take It Back," a 1991 music video using a recycling-themed version of the song
 Yakkety Yak, the name of version 16.10 of the Ubuntu operating system
 Yakkity Yak, an animated television series

See also
 "Yakety Sax," a pop jazz instrumental
 Yackety Yack, an Australian movie
 Yackety Yak, a yearbook at the University of North Carolina at Chapel Hill